The Night Shift is a 2011 American zombie comedy film directed and written by Thomas Smith.  It stars Khristian Fulmer as a cemetery watchman who must contend with undead residents and paranormal occurrences.

Plot 
A night watchman at the local cemetery deals with zombies and other residents who refuse to be still. Along with his skeleton sidekick Herbie and boss Claire, he must confront a hostile takeover from a rival cemetery, a werewolf, and Adremalech, a powerful demon.

Cast 
 Khristian Fulmer as Rue Morgan
 Erin Lilley as Claire Rennfield
 Soren Odom as Herbie
 Jordan Woodall as Curly
 Jonathan Pruitt as Capt. Roderick Blake
 Don Bloom as Doc
 Andrew Crider as Adremalech
 Brendon Cooke as Wolfman

Production 
The film was shot in Mobile, Alabama from May to June 2010.  Director Smith self-financed the film; the budget was approximately $10,000.  Smith's influences include Steven Spielberg and 1950s-era B movies.  It was based on a short film of the same name directed by Smith.

Release 
R Squared Films released The Night Shift on DVD on October 25, 2011.

Reception 
Mark L. Miller of Ain't It Cool News called it "charming and fun" and recommended it to fans of horror spoofs.  Vance Garrett of Independent Film Reviews called it "a fun and engaging Sunday afternoon diversion that is more than suitable for family viewing."

References

External links 
 

2011 films
2011 comedy horror films
American comedy horror films
American independent films
American zombie comedy films
Demons in film
American werewolf films
Films shot in Mobile, Alabama
Features based on short films
2011 independent films
2010s English-language films
2010s American films